Lutgen or Lütgen is a Low German, Danish, Wallonian and Luxembourgish surname. It is derived from a diminutive of a Germanic personal name formed either with the first element liut "people" or hlod/hlut "famous" (e. g. Ludger, Ludolf, Ludwig, Luitpold, Luther) and may refer to:
Alphonse Lutgen (born 1939), Luxembourgian photographer
Benoît Lutgen (born 1970), Belgian politician
Berthe Lutgen (born 1935), Luxembourgian painter
James Lutgen, American convicted of manslaughter
Guy Lutgen (1936–2020), Belgian politician
Hulda Lütken (1896–1946), Danish poet and novelist
Kurt Lütgen (1911–1992), German journalist and writer
Simone Lutgen (1906–1994), Luxembourgian sculptor

References 

German-language surnames